Vanzetti is an Italian surname. Notable people with the surname include:

Bartolomeo Vanzetti (1888–1927), Italian-born U.S. anarchist (see Sacco and Vanzetti)
Tito Vanzetti (1809–1888), Italian surgeon

See also
Sacco and Vanzetti (disambiguation)

Italian-language surnames